De Lint  family is the name of a Dutch patrician family.

History

The family history starts with Adriaan de Lint who was born in 1600 in Klundert. His descendentants played an important role in the Protestant church and the local government of the North Brabant province.

Notable members
Derek de Lint , actor

Bibliography
Nederland's Patriciaat 29 (1943), p. 275-290.

Dutch patrician families